Mount Drummond is a summit in Banff National Park, Alberta, Canada.

Mount Drummond was named for Thomas Drummond, an explorer.

See also 
 List of mountains in the Canadian Rockies

References

Mountains of Banff National Park
Three-thousanders of Alberta
Alberta's Rockies